Sir George Frederick Sleight, 1st Baronet (26 March 1853 – 19 March 1921) was an English fishing trawler owner.

Sleight claimed that he started his career as a cockle-gatherer on the seashore at Grimsby. He went on to build a fishing empire that boasted the largest fleet of trawling smacks in the world. He was later a pioneer of steam trawlers and also acquired the largest fleet of those in the world. During the First World War almost all his vessels (50–60 of them) were commandeered for mine sweeping and patrol duties and over thirty were sunk.

Having previously been knighted in the 1918 New Year Honours, Sleight was created a baronet in the 1920 Birthday Honours.

He died aged 68 and was succeeded in the baronetcy by his son, Ernest.

Footnotes

References
Obituary, The Times, 21 March 1921
Kidd, Charles, Williamson, David (editors). Debrett's Peerage and Baronetage (1990 edition). New York: St Martin's Press, 1990.

1853 births
1921 deaths
People from Grimsby
Baronets in the Baronetage of the United Kingdom
Knights Bachelor
British fishers
English businesspeople
Businesspeople awarded knighthoods